The first season of the black comedy slasher television series Scream Queens originally aired on Fox in the United States. It premiered on September 22, 2015 and concluded on December 8, 2015. The season consists of 13 episodes. 

The first season takes place at the fictional college campus of Wallace University. One of the sororities, Kappa Kappa Tau, becomes plagued by a serial killer, who uses the university's Red Devil mascot as a disguise.

The season stars Emma Roberts, Skyler Samuels, Lea Michele, Glen Powell, Diego Boneta, Abigail Breslin, Keke Palmer, Oliver Hudson, Nasim Pedrad, Lucien Laviscount, Billie Lourd, and Jamie Lee Curtis.

Cast

Main
 Emma Roberts as Chanel Oberlin
 Skyler Samuels as Grace Gardner
 Lea Michele as Hester Ulrich / Chanel #6
 Glen Powell as Chad Radwell
 Diego Boneta as Pete Martinez 
 Abigail Breslin as Libby Putney / Chanel #5
 Keke Palmer as Zayday Williams
 Oliver Hudson as Weston "Wes" Gardner 
 Nasim Pedrad as Gigi Caldwell / Jess Meyer
 Lucien Laviscount as Earl Grey 
 Billie Lourd as Sadie Swenson / Chanel #3
 Jamie Lee Curtis as Dean Cathy Munsch

Special guest stars
 Niecy Nash as Denise Hemphill
 Ariana Grande as Sonya Herfmann / Chanel #2
 Nick Jonas as Boone Clemens
 Chad Michael Murray as Brad Radwell

Recurring
 Breezy Eslin as Jennifer
 Jeanna Han as Sam
 Aaron Rhodes as Roger
 Austin Rhodes as Dodger
 Evan Paley as Caulfield Mount Herman
 Anna Grace Barlow as Bethany Stevens / Mary Mulligan
 Grace Phipps as Mandy Greenwell
 Jim Klock as Detective Chisolm
 Jan Hoag as Ms. Agatha Bean

Guest
 McKaley Miller as Sophia Doyle
 Chelsea Ricketts as Amy Meyer
 Anna Margaret Collins as Coco Cohen
 Brianne Howey as Melanie Dorkus
 Whitney Meyer as Tiffany DeSalle / Deaf Taylor Swift
 Deneen Tyler as Shondell Washington
 Roger Bart as Dr. Herfmann
 Charisma Carpenter as Mrs. Herfmann
 David Simpson as Aaron Cohen / Coney
 Jennifer Aspen as adult Mandy Greenwell
 Tavi Gevinson as Feather McCarthy
 Philip Casnoff as Steven Munsch
 Alan Thicke as Tad Radwell
 Julia Duffy as Bunny Radwell
 Patrick Schwarzenegger as Thad Radwell
 Rachele Brooke Smith as Muffy St. Pierre-Radwell
 Faith Prince as Kristy Swenson
 Gary Grubbs as Mr. Swenson
 LB Brown as Freddy Swenson
 Wallace Langham as Mr. Putney
 Lara Grice as Mrs. Putney
 Jean Louisa Kelly as Delight Ulrich
 Steven Culp as Clark Ulrich

Episodes

Casting

In December 2014, it was reported that Emma Roberts and Jamie Lee Curtis would be featured as series regulars. In January 2015, Lea Michele, Keke Palmer, and Abigail Breslin joined the series' main cast, as well as actress/singer Ariana Grande in a recurring capacity. Later that month, The Hollywood Reporter confirmed that Nick Jonas would recur throughout the first season. In February 2015, newcomer Billie Lourd and Skyler Samuels joined the series' main cast. Later in the month, Niecy Nash joined the recurring cast as Denise, a kick-butt security guard, as well as British actor Lucien Laviscount, Diego Boneta and Glen Powell being confirmed as regulars. In March, Nasim Pedrad was cast as a regular. On March 13, 2015, previously cast Joe Manganiello was forced to depart the series, due to publicity obligations for his film Magic Mike XXL. Oliver Hudson was hired as his replacement. On June 24, 2015, it was announced that Charisma Carpenter and Roger Bart would portray Chanel #2's (Ariana Grande) parents. In August 2015, Philip Casnoff was cast as Cathy's (Jamie Lee Curtis) husband. In September 2015, series co-creater Ryan Murphy announced, through his Twitter feed, that Patrick Schwarzenegger had joined the cast. He portrayed Chad Radwell's (Glen Powell) younger brother, Thad. His older brother, Brad, was portrayed by Chad Michael Murray, while Alan Thicke and Julia Duffy were cast as their parents Mr. and Mrs. Radwell: all appearing in the "Thanksgiving episode".

Reception

Critical response 
The first season of Scream Queens received mixed to positive reviews from critics. The review aggregator Rotten Tomatoes gave the first season a 68% of approval with an average rating of 6.35/10, based on 74 reviews. The site's critical consensus reads: "Too tasteless for mainstream viewers and too silly for horror enthusiasts, Scream Queens fails to satisfy." On Metacritic, the season was given a score of 59 out of 100, based on 33 critics, indicating "mixed or average reviews".

IGN reviewer Terri Schwartz gave a very positive review of the two-hour premiere, giving it a 9.7 out of 10 and saying "Ryan Murphy has worked his TV magic again with a killer start to Scream Queens. From the acting to the costuming to the writing, everything about this concept and execution works. Scream Queens is as funny and self-aware as it needs to be to not bore audiences, but also offers up enough mystery and intrigue to keep even the biggest skeptic entertained." The Telegraph also gave a positive review, awarding the show four stars out of five. They commented that the show pummels "the viewer into submission with sheer, rictus-grinning relentlessness" and praised it for being "shiny, gory and whip-smart."

Robert Rorke of The New York Post panned the series, later putting it on his list of 10 worst TV shows of 2015 and criticized Roberts' performance, saying that she "can't act".

Ratings

Home media

References

External links

 
 

2015 American television seasons
Season 1